Maja Miljković (born 11 April 1988) is a Serbian professional female basketball player. She plays as a point guard for CSM Satu Mare in the Liga Națională.

External links
Profile at eurobasket.com
Profile at Fiba Europe site

1988 births
Living people
Serbian expatriate basketball people in Hungary
Serbian expatriate basketball people in Spain
Serbian expatriate basketball people in Russia
Serbian expatriate basketball people in Romania
Serbian expatriate basketball people in Belgium
Serbian expatriate basketball people in France
Club Sportiv Municipal Târgoviște players
Sportspeople from Leskovac
Serbian women's basketball players
ŽKK Partizan players
Point guards